The Rural Municipality of Vanscoy No. 345 is a rural municipality (RM) in the Canadian province of Saskatchewan within Census Division No. 12 and  Division No. 5. Located in the central portion of the province, it is southwest of the city of Saskatoon.

History 
The RM of Richland No. 345 was originally incorporated as a rural municipality on December 13, 1909. Its name was changed to the RM of Loganton No. 345 on October 16, 1909 and then renamed again to the RM of Vanscoy No. 345 on April 16, 1934.

Geography 
The boundaries of the RM of Vanscoy No. 345 extend to the north and northwest by the RM of Corman Park No. 344, to the west side of the South Saskatchewan River, to the south by the RM of Montrose No. 315, and to the west by the RM of Perdue No. 346. To the north used to be the RM of Park No. 375, which was disorganised on December 31, 1969 and assumed by the RM of Corman Park No. 344.

Communities and localities 
The following urban municipalities are surrounded by the RM.

Towns
Asquith
Delisle

Villages
Vanscoy

The following unincorporated communities are within the RM.

Localities
 Asquith Station
 Dunfermline
 Hawoods
 Pipin
 Vade

Demographics 

Government 
The RM of Vanscoy No. 345 is governed by an elected municipal council and an appointed administrator that meets on the second Tuesday of every month. The reeve of the RM is Floyd Chapple while its administrator is Tony Obrigewitch. The RM's office is located in Vanscoy.

Vanscoy is served by the Vanscoy Police Service, which consists of one officer and is in partnership with the Royal Canadian Mounted Police.

Transportation 
Rail
CNR Saskatoon Calgary Branch—serves Saskatoon, Hawker, Vanscoy, Delisle, Laura, Tessier
Delisle - Elrose Branch CNR—serves Saskatoon, Delisle Birdview, Swanson, Ardath, Conquest

Roads
Highway 45—serves Delisle, Saskatchewan
Highway 7—serves Delisle, Saskatchewan and Vanscoy, Saskatchewan
Highway 673—serves Delisle, Saskatchewan
Highway 672—serves Vanscoy, Saskatchewan
Highway 673—serves Delisle, Saskatchewan

See also 
List of rural municipalities in Saskatchewan

References 

Vanscoy
Vanscoy No. 345, Saskatchewan